Crassispira consociata is a species of sea snail, a marine gastropod mollusk in the family Pseudomelatomidae.

Description
The length of the shell attains 24 mm. The yellowish brown whorls are doubly carinated at the suture, below which the surface is concave to the periphery. The six longitudinal ribs are strong and crossed by raised revolving lines ; yellowish brown.

Distribution
This marine species occurs off Senegal and Angola.

References

 E. A. Smith. Ann. Mag. N. H., 1877, p. 496
 Smith, Edgar A. "XLIX. Diagnoses of new species of Pleurotomidæ in the British Museum." Journal of Natural History 19.114 (1877): 488–501.

External links
  Tucker, J.K. 2004 Catalog of recent and fossil turrids (Mollusca: Gastropoda). Zootaxa 682:1-1295
 

consociata
Gastropods described in 1877